Norhayati binti Omar is a Malaysian politician and served as Negeri Sembilan State Executive Councillor.

Election results

Honours 
  :
  Knight Commander of the Order of Loyalty to Negeri Sembilan (DSNS) - Dato' (2003)

References 

Living people
People from Negeri Sembilan
Malaysian people of Malay descent
United Malays National Organisation politicians
21st-century Malaysian politicians
Members of the Negeri Sembilan State Legislative Assembly
Negeri Sembilan state executive councillors
Women MLAs in Negeri Sembilan
Year of birth missing (living people)
21st-century Malaysian women politicians